The 510th Heavy Panzer Battalion (abbreviated: "s PzAbt 510") was a German heavy Panzer Abteilung (an independent battalion-sized unit), equipped with heavy tanks. The 510th saw action on the Eastern Front during the Second World War.

History
The 510th was formed June 1944; in July it was sent to Lithuania, where it fought in the Courland Pocket until the end of the war, attached to the 14th Panzer Division. Elements of the battalion were evacuated from Courland and transferred to the Western Front, where they subsequently surrendered to the Western Allies. A battle group with the last 15 Tiger tanks was left behind in Courland, where it surrendered to the Red Army.

See also
German heavy tank battalion
Organisation of a SS Panzer Division
Panzer Division

External links
 Schwere Panzer-Abteilung 510 unit history

Military units and formations established in 1944
Military units and formations disestablished in 1945
510sPzAbt